Comte Louis Charles d'Hervilly (26 February 1756, Paris – 14 November 1795, London) was a French nobleman and émigré. He was involved in the abortive landing at Quiberon. His daughter married the general Marie-François Auguste de Caffarelli du Falga.

Family

Life

D'Hervilly is listed as one of the persons of note buried in Old St Pancras Churchyard in London on the Burdett-Coutts Memorial in the churchyard to commemorate lost graves therein.

American Revolution, Rennes, les Tuileries

Escape and invasion

Bibliography 

 Annuaire de la noblesse de France, 1880, 1881, B.n.F. : 8° Lc35. 10
 H. Jougla de Morenas (then Comte Raoul de Warren), Grand armorial de France, Paris, 1934–1949, tome : 2, Cote B.n.F. : Fol. Lm1. 209.
 M. Michaud, Biographie universelle ancienne et moderne, T. 19, p. 362 et 363.

See also
 Garde constitutionnelle du Roi
 Invasion of France (1795)
 Joseph de Puisaye

External links 
 

1756 births
1795 deaths
French generals
People of the Ancien Régime
Counts of France
French people of the American Revolution
French military personnel of the French Revolutionary Wars